Rachel Yeoh Li Wen (born 30 December 1998) is a Malaysian artistic gymnast. She is the 2021 Southeast Asian Games champion on the uneven bars and balance beam.

Personal life 
Yeoh was born in Pulau Pinang in 1998. She graduated from University of Putra Malaysia with a Bachelor of Science in Statistics in 2022.

Gymnastics career

2015–17
Yeoh competed at the 2015 Asian Championships where she helped Malaysia place fourth as a team.

In 2017, while at a competition in Taiwan, Yeoh hyperextended her knee on vault which resulted in a posterior cruciate ligament injury on both knees. As a result, she had to miss the 2017 Southeast Asian Games.

2019 
Yeoh returned to international competition in 2019 at the Stella Zakharova Cup. In May, she competed at the Zhaoqing Challenge Cup where she placed seventh on uneven bars. After missing out on the Southeast Asian Games in 2015 and 2017, Yeoh finally competed at the 2019 Southeast Asian Games where she won the bronze medal on uneven bars behind compatriot Farah Ann Abdul Hadi and Đỗ Thị Ngọc Hương of Vietnam.

2022 
The 2021 Southeast Asian Games were postponed until 2022 due to the global COVID-19 pandemic. While she was there, Yeoh won the gold medal on the uneven bars and balance beam events and won the bronze medal in the all-around event behind Rifda Irfanaluthfi of Indonesia and Aleah Finnegan of the Philippines.

Competitive history

References

External links 
 

1998 births
Living people
Malaysian female artistic gymnasts
Sportspeople from Penang
Southeast Asian Games gold medalists for Malaysia
Southeast Asian Games bronze medalists for Malaysia
Competitors at the 2019 Southeast Asian Games
Competitors at the 2021 Southeast Asian Games
University of Putra Malaysia alumni
Southeast Asian Games medalists in gymnastics